Bidar Airport ಬೀದರ್ ವಿಮಾನ ನಿಲ್ದಾಣ is an airport in Bidar, India. It operates as a civil enclave on the Indian Air Force's Bidar Air Force Station. 

Bidar is one of India's oldest military air bases, and serves as a training school for air force pilots and the home of the Surya Kiran Aerobatics Team (SKAT). In pursuance to the long-pending demand for a civilian airport in Bidar, the Indian Air Force agreed to allow commercial flights operations, with a civilian terminal built in 2008-09 ahead of the Guru-ta-Gaddi celebrations at the Guru Nanak Jhira Sahib.

Bidar Air Force Station

The Indian Air Force operates the Air Force Academy that operates Kiran Mk II trainers while the Hawk Operational Training Squadron (HOTS) operates BAE Hawk Advanced jet trainers Bidar was also base for the Surya Kiran, the aerobatics demonstration team of the IAF.

Airlines and destinations

See also
Bidar Air Force Station

References 

Indian Air Force bases
Airports in Karnataka
Bidar
Buildings and structures in Bidar district
Transport in Bidar district
Airports with year of establishment missing